Devil in the Flesh is a 1998 American erotic thriller film directed by Steve Cohen and starring Rose McGowan and Alex McArthur. The film was co-written by Cohen with Kelly Carlin-McCall, Robert McCall and Michael Michaud, based on a story by Kurt Anderson and Richard Brandes, and is not based on the twice-filmed Raymond Radiguet novel Le Diable au corps (The Devil in the Flesh). The film was also released under the title Dearly Devoted.

Plot
A beautiful, troubled teenage girl, Debbie Strand, is being brought up by her previously estranged grandmother in Los Angeles after her mother and her mother's boyfriend die in a suspicious house fire. Her grandmother is an extremely strict, fundamentalist Christian who believes that her granddaughter is exactly like her mother. She forces Debbie to wear the grandmother's old clothes instead of buying her new ones, and abuses her by beating her with the grandmother's walking cane. When she tells Debbie she's putting her in a reform school, Debbie yanks her cane out of her hands and kills her with it.

Debbie becomes enthralled with Peter Rinaldi, an English teacher at her new school. However, Peter has a fiancée and strong scruples, so rejects Debbie's repeated advances. Peter finds that his life is ruined and bodies are piling up. During the hectic climax, Debbie breaks into his fiancée, Marilyn's, home with the intention of killing her. Peter realizes Debbie has gone there and follows her. While he is on his way, Debbie confronts Marilyn, who attempts to flee through the kitchen, but is brought down by Debbie, who knocks her unconscious. As Debbie attempts to murder her, Peter rushes in and stops her.

Cast

Sequel
A sequel titled Devil in the Flesh 2 was released in 2000, with actress Jodi Lyn O'Keefe replacing McGowan.

External links
 
 
 

1998 films
1998 independent films
1998 thriller films
1990s English-language films
1990s erotic thriller films
American erotic thriller films
American independent films
Films about stalking
Films set in Los Angeles
Teen thriller films
Films directed by Steve Cohen
1990s American films